Freshfield railway station serves the Freshfield district of Formby, Merseyside, England. The station is located on the Southport branch of the Merseyrail network's Northern Line.

History
Freshfield opened in 1854 as an intermediate station on the Liverpool, Crosby and Southport Railway. It was built at the insistence of the local landowner, Thomas Fresh, to provide him access to the railway, as when the railway opened in 1848, there was no village for it to serve. Fresh donated his own land for the purpose.  It became part of the Lancashire and Yorkshire Railway (LYR) on 14 June 1855 who took over from the (LCSR). The Lancashire and Yorkshire Railway amalgamated with the London and North Western Railway on 1 January 1922 and in turn was Grouped into the London, Midland and Scottish Railway in 1923. Nationalisation followed in 1948 and in 1978 the station became part of the Merseyrail network's Northern Line (operated by British Rail until privatisation in 1995).

Facilities
The station is staffed, 15 minutes before the first train and 15 minutes after the last train, and has platform CCTV. There is a payphone, shelters, booking office and live departure and arrival screens, for passenger information. The station has a free car park, with 82 spaces, as well as a 10-space cycle rack and secure indoor storage for 44 cycles. Although both platforms are linked by a footbridge, wheelchair users can access both platforms via the level crossing.

Services
Trains operate every 15 minutes throughout the day from Monday to Saturday and on summer Sundays to Southport to the north, and to Hunts Cross via Liverpool Central to the south. Winter Sunday services are every 30 minutes in each direction.

Gallery

References

External links

Railway stations in the Metropolitan Borough of Sefton
DfT Category E stations
Former Lancashire and Yorkshire Railway stations
Railway stations in Great Britain opened in 1854
Railway stations served by Merseyrail
Formby